Mursalitsa Peak is the mostly ice-covered peak on the west side of northern Sentinel Range in Ellsworth Mountains, Antarctica rising to 2334 m on the side ridge extending from Mount Sharp on the main crest of the range.  It is named after Mursalitsa Ridge in the Rhodope Mountains, Bulgaria.

Location
US mapping in 1961.

See also
 Mountains in Antarctica

Maps
 Newcomer Glacier.  Scale 1:250 000 topographic map.  Reston, Virginia: US Geological Survey, 1961.
 Antarctic Digital Database (ADD). Scale 1:250000 topographic map of Antarctica. Scientific Committee on Antarctic Research (SCAR). Since 1993, regularly updated.

Notes

References
 Mursalitsa Peak SCAR Composite Gazetteer of Antarctica
 Bulgarian Antarctic Gazetteer Antarctic Place-names Commission (in Bulgarian)
 Basic data (in English)

External links
 Mursalitsa Peak. Copernix satellite image

Ellsworth Mountains
Bulgaria and the Antarctic
Mountains of Ellsworth Land